Medhaṅkara Buddha is the second of the 27th buddhas who preceded the historical Gotama Buddha.He was also the second Buddha of the Sāramaṇḍa kalpa.

In the Buddhavamsa, he is briefly mentioned as:
Inneumarable aeons ago, Taṇhaṅkara Buddha, Medhaṅkara Buddha, Saraṇaṅkara Buddha and Dīpaṃkara Buddha were born in the Sāramaṇḍa kalpa.

Biography 
He was born in Yaghara to King Sudeva and Queen Yasodharā. When he became an adult, he succeeded his father and reigned over the country for 8,000 years. When he saw the Four sights, he decided to leave the castle. As soon as his son was born, he left to practise in the forest. He had practiced asceticism for half a month(15 days). He gained enlightenment under the Bodhi, Butea monosperma.

The incarnation of Gotama Buddha had a chance to see him. He became a disciple of the Buddha and asked for his wish. However, he did not grant his wish. After death, the incarnation become a Deva at the Desire realm

Medhaṅkara Buddha live for 90,000 years. He had liberated many beings. He attained parinibbāna along with his disciples.

References

Footnotes

Sources 

Buddhas